Fabio Hasa (born 12 August 1996) is an Albanian professional footballer who currently plays as a defensive midfielder for Kategoria e Parë club Burreli in Albania.

References

1996 births
Living people
Footballers from Tirana
Albanian footballers
Association football midfielders
KF Teuta Durrës players
FK Partizani Tirana players
KS Turbina Cërrik players
KF Tërbuni Pukë players
KS Burreli players
Kategoria Superiore players
Kategoria e Parë players